"Love at First Feel" is a song by Australian hard rock band AC/DC. It is the second track of the international version of their album Dirty Deeds Done Dirt Cheap, released in November 1976 (see 1976 in music), and was written by Angus Young, Malcolm Young, and Bon Scott. The international version was not released in the United States until April 1981 (see 1981 in music).

"Love at First Feel" was not included on Dirty Deeds Done Dirt Cheap'''s original Australian edition, released in September 1976, making it one of only two tracks from international AC/DC albums not available on the band's Australian albums. (The other is "Cold Hearted Man", released on European pressings of Powerage) Conversely, several songs that are available on Australian AC/DC albums did not see overseas release until more than thirty years later. However, "Love at First Feel" was released in Australia as a single in January 1977, with "Problem Child" as its B-side, which peaked in the Kent Music Report Singles Chart Top 100.

Singer/songwriter Mark Kozelek does a cover of this track on his album of AC/DC covers entitled What's Next to the Moon.

French band Trust, who supported AC/DC on their Paris, France date in the fall of 1978, re-worked "Love At First Feel" with French lyrics for their 1978 single, "Prends Pas Ton Flingue" b/w "Paris By Night."  The song later became the title track of their 1988 live album, Paris By Night''.

Personnel
Bon Scott – lead vocals
Angus Young – lead guitar
Malcolm Young – rhythm guitar, backing vocals
Mark Evans – bass
Phil Rudd – drums

Charts

References

AC/DC songs
1976 songs
Songs written by Angus Young
Songs written by Bon Scott
Songs written by Malcolm Young
Song recordings produced by Harry Vanda
Song recordings produced by George Young (rock musician)
Atco Records singles